Portrait of Ferdinand VI as a Boy is a c. 1723 painting by the French painter Jean Ranc, measuring 144 by 116 cm. It is now in the Museo del Prado in Madrid.

It shows the future Ferdinand VI of Spain aged 10, wearing the insignia of the Order of the Golden Fleece and of a knight of the Order of the Holy Spirit.

References

1723 paintings
Paintings of the Museo del Prado by French artists
Paintings of children
18th-century portraits